Flaviana Bahati Charles is a Tanzanian lawyer and the executive director of Business and Human Rights Tanzania (BHRT). She is also an active member of the African Union's Network of African Women in Conflict Prevention and Mediation (FemWise-Africa). Charles serves as the Chairperson of the Coalition of Women Human Rights Defenders in Tanzania, and is the Secretary General of the African Bar Association (AFBA), which is the association of lawyers in Africa.

Early life 
The village is impoverished, relying on the sale of onions to passersby on the highway. The local order of Roman Catholic nuns, the Teresina Sisters, run the primary and trade schools, a hospital, a clinic, and an orphanage. The nuns are heavily dependent on overseas donations.

Charles was able to attend the Mtandika Trade School through a sponsorship grant, one of only ten students to do so. She was brought up by Sister Barberina Mhagala, the proctor of the trade school, which provides young girls who were unable to pursue secondary education with tailoring and sewing skills.

In 2002, Charles earned her Bachelor of Laws (LLB) from the University of Dar es Salaam. She went on to earn her master's degree in International Law and Human Rights in 2010 at Coventry University in England.

Career 
After graduating, Charles went on to become a program officer at the Legal and Human Rights Centre in Tanzania, where she co-authored publications about gender equity in the extractive sector, community rights in investment, corporate social responsibility, and the right to a clean, healthy, and safe environment. Charles joined numerous organizations centered around law and human rights, including the Tanganyika Law Society (Continuing Legal Education Committee), East African Law Society, African Coalition for Corporate Accountability, Tanzania Women Lawyers Association, and Tanzania Human Rights Defenders Association. Additionally, Charles lectures at the University of Bagamoyo and the Law School of Tanzania, focusing on gender equity, community investment rights, right to clean, and corporate social responsibility.

Charles was formerly President of the public speaking and leadership-oriented Toastmasters Club, Tanzania branch, and Vice President of the Tanganyika Law Society (TLS), a bar association.

Charles is currently the chairperson of the Coalition of Women Human Rights in Tanzania, and the Secretary General of the African Bar Association (AFBA). She is an editor on the Developments in the Field Panel of the Business and Human Rights Journal at the Cambridge University Press.

Charles has commented on the impacts of oil and gas development on women and poor local communities, and the negligence of current legal frameworks that reinforce gender disparities.

References 

Living people
21st-century Tanzanian lawyers
Tanzanian women lawyers
Year of birth missing (living people)
University of Dar es Salaam alumni
Alumni of Coventry University